This is a list of Danish football transfers for the 2010 summer transfer window. Only moves featuring at least one Danish Superliga club are listed.

The Danish Superliga 2009-10 season ended on May 16, 2010, with the Danish Superliga 2010-11 season starting on July 18, 2010. The summer transfer window opened on 1 July 2010, although a few transfers took place prior to that date; including carry-overs from the winter 2009–10 transfer window. The window closed at midnight on 31 August 2010.

Transfers

Notes
 Player will officially join his new club on 1 July 2010.

References

Football transfers summer 2010
2010
2009–10 in Danish football
2010–11 in Danish football